600s may refer to:
 The period from 600 to 699, almost synonymous with the 7th century (601–700).
 The period from 600 to 609, known as the 600s (decade), almost synonymous with the 61st decade (601-610).